Jean Brun may refer to:

 Jean Brun (cyclist) (1926–1993), Swiss cyclist
 Jean Brun (general) (1849–1911), French general and politician